Kim Dong-Chan (born December 19, 1981) is a South Korean footballer who plays for Malaysia Super League side PKNS F.C., primarily as a forward. In 2013, he played for Persita Tangerang.

Club statistics

References

External links

 Kim Dong-Chan profile at jsgoal.jp
 Kim Dong-Chan profile at liga-indonesia.co.id 

1981 births
Living people
South Korean footballers
J2 League players
Mito HollyHock players
Expatriate footballers in Japan
Liga 1 (Indonesia) players
Expatriate footballers in Indonesia
Expatriate footballers in Malaysia
Association football forwards